Saxifraga paradoxa, commonly known as the fragile saxifrage, is a perennial plant species in the family Saxifragaceae, which occurs as a tertiary relict and endemic Saxifraga species in the South-Eastern Alps. Count Kaspar Maria von Sternberg described this species in his work Revisio Saxifragarum iconibus of 1810.

Description 
Its shining and small leaves are mid- to bright green, in shape usually reniform (kidney-like) and slightly lobed. Saxifraga paradoxa characteristic are also small pale green coloured flowers that have linearly-shaped petals, red anthers and are arranged into an axillary cyme. The plant's flowering period is between May and August.

Distribution and conservation 
This Saxifraga species native range are South-Eastern Alps, with most of its populations inhabiting Slovenia and Austria. In Austria Saxifraga paradoxa occurs in Carinthia and Styria, while in Slovenia its growing area includes valleys of rivers Hudinja and Lobnica (tributary of Drava) near Pohorje, as well as Kozjak mountains and Košenjak. Its habitat usually consists of damp and shaded rocky screes with non-calcareous basis, mostly containing granite and gneiss. After this species Slovakian botanist Ladislav Mucina named plant community Saxifragetum paradoxae, with Saxifraga paradoxa being its characteristic species.

Saxifraga paradoxa has not yet been evaluated for the IUCN Red List.

Taxonomy 
So-called European purple saxifrages (members of Saxifraga's section Porphyrion and subsection Oppositifoliae) are a big group of numerous taxa with uncertain taxonomic position, widely distributed in mountain ranges of central and southern Europe. Researchers studied their evolutionary relationship with a use of amplified fragment length polymorphism (AFLP) fingerprinting and Saxifraga paradoxa was shown not to be genetically divergent taxon. Recent research treats Saxifraga paradoxa as a member of Saxifraga's section Saxifraga and subsection Arachnoideae.

References

External links 
 
 

paradoxa
Flora of Europe
Flora of the Alps